Culverhouse is an English topographic surname, which originally meaning a person who tended or lived near a dovecote, derived from the Old English culfrehus ("dovecote"). Dovecotes were common on English estates in the medieval period. The name may refer to:

Gay Culverhouse (1947–2020), American academic administrator
Hugh Culverhouse (1919–1994), American lawyer and NFL team owner
Ian Culverhouse (born 1964), English footballer
Mike Culverhouse (born 1951), British police officer
Peter Culverhouse (1972–2003), British cancer patient

References

English-language surnames
Surnames of British Isles origin
English toponymic surnames